Richard Edward Cecil Law, 8th Baron Ellenborough (14 January 1926 – 7 June 2013), was a member of the House of Lords.

Law was educated at Eton College. He became Lord Ellenborough and entered the House of Lords upon the death of his father Henry Law, 7th Baron Ellenborough, in 1945, at the young age of 19. He attended the House of Lords regularly sitting as a Conservative peer.

He was a director of Towry Law Group between 1958 and 1994 and President of the National Union of Ratepayers Association between 1960 and 1990.

Law married Rachel Mary Hedley in 1953. They had three sons: Rupert Edward Henry Law, 9th Baron Ellenborough, the Hon. Edmund Ivor Cecil Law, and the Hon. Charles Law. Richard Law died in 2013.

Ancestry

References

1926 births
2013 deaths
Alumni of Magdalene College, Cambridge
Conservative Party (UK) hereditary peers
People educated at Eton College
Eldest sons of British hereditary barons
Richard

Ellenborough